Shengang District is a district in northwestern Taichung City, Taiwan, known for its origin of suncakes.

Administrative divisions 
Shengang, Zhuangqian, Beizhuang, Zhuanghou, Zunqian, Zundu, Xinzhuang, Shanpi, Shekou, Shenan, Sanjiao, Dashe, Anli, Fengzhou, Shenzhou and Xizhou Village.

Native products 
 Longan
 Lychee
 Rice
 Pumpkin
 Moon cake
 Suncake

Tourist attractions 
 Taiwan Balloons Museum

Transportation 
National Highway 1 and National Highway 4 run through Shengang.

Notable natives 
 Chang Hung-lu, member of Legislative Yuan

References 

Districts of Taichung